Gaston Azcárraga Andrade, is a Mexican businessman, currently fugitive of the Mexican justice system, who has controlled Grupo Posadas and Mexicana Airlines, and is wanted for financial crimes linked to the latter company prior to its bankruptcy.

The order for his arrest was overturned, but in late 2018 was reaffirmed, and Azcárraga remains at large, living in luxury in the United States, having requested asylum there.

References

Fugitives wanted by Mexico
Living people
Mexican business executives
Year of birth missing (living people)
Azcárraga family